Lovetone was a manufacturer of analog effect pedals in England in the 1990s and 2000s.
The effects were created by Vlad Naslas and Daniel Coggins, and their pedals were noted for their tongue-in-cheek names like the "Big Cheese" and the "Ring Stinger".

Most Lovetone effects replicate a popular vintage analog effect in part, but usually implement the effect in ways not previously seen in smaller so-called "stompbox" effects units.  Many Lovetone units are noted for the ability to control multiple parameters of the effect through the use of low frequency oscillators (LFOs), expression pedals, or control voltage (CV)—features more commonly found in analog synthesizers and synthesizer modules. This ability to create extremely unusual sounds has made the pedals highly regarded by musicians and producers.  The company was able to attract a diverse list of notable bands, musicians and producers to use its effects, including the Beastie Boys, Sonic Youth, Stereolab, Nikki Sixx, Simple Minds, John Squire, Metallica, Suede, Blur, Oasis, Radiohead, Matthew Sweet, Pulp, Mike Gordon, Tim Simenon, Adrian Utley, Supergrass, Nellee Hooper, Pete Kember (aka Sonic Boom), Paul Schroeder, Adrian Sherwood, Will Sergeant, Chris Kimsey, Flood, Gil Norton, Chris Tsangarides, Bob Rock, Spike Stent, Dave Stewart, Doug Wimbish, Guy Chambers and Alan Moulder.

History

The sale of Lovetone pedals began in 1995.  The company ethos, design goals and work was initially shared between the two co-founders, but with Coggins almost solely responsible for the circuit designs and electronics manufacture and with Naslas doing the casework, graphics and sales. The four earliest designs were the "Meatball" (Envelope Filter, May 1995), "Doppelganger" (Phaser/Vibrato, September 1995), "Big Cheese" (Fuzz/Distortion, Summer 1995) and "Brown Source" (Overdrive, Summer 1995); the latter two units were made in a smaller-format housing until later reissued together in 1999 as the two-in-one "Cheese Source" (the world's first stereo-wireable fuzz box?) in the larger-format Lovetone enclosure.

A simple black plasticised aluminium sheet pedalboard with cables, power supply and a "Cripple Creek Case Co." bespoke flight case were sometimes issued as extras to this "classic" four-pedal "rig".

In 1997, the stereo "Wobulator" was introduced after an abortive first attempt in 1996 that was never manufactured as it alarmed Coggins who had been testing it using headphones: the released version was deemed to sound 'easier on the brain'. In 1998, the "Ring Stinger" (Ring Modulator/Octave Fuzz) was designed and released in early 1999 along with the Cheese Source (a combination of the Big Cheese and Brown Source) and an updated Mk 2 version of the Doppelganger, which added a few extra features to the earlier design. Power supply connectors were changed around this time from the old-fashioned mini-jack to the more commonplace DC dual concentric barrel variety.

Production was generally inconsistent, so after a given pedal's initial run, it might become unavailable for a period of time.  The Meatball was always quite popular and available fairly consistently.  Still, some models would go out of stock for long periods.

The last new Lovetone design to be introduced was the "?" Stereo analogue Flanger (a.k.a. "Flange with no Name") which was designed in early 2000 and released later that summer.

In 2001 the company announced that they would cease production of all pedals. This led to an explosion in price of existing units.   After this announcement, it was common to see Lovetone pedals on the secondhand market at prices nearly double their original sale price - a trend that still hasn't abated well over a decade since the last official pedals were sold.

In 2003 the company announced that they would again be making the Meatball and Cheese Source pedals, to be sold through Daniel Coggins's then newly formed company Dinosaural, which became the primary point of contact for Lovetone technical support and repairs until 2009.

Vlad Naslas took charge of Lovetone from April 2008, Dan Coggins having left the Lovetone business at that same point. Coggins ceased providing repairs or technical support for Lovetone products in January 2009. By 2012, he'd auctioned off his own set of personal Lovetone pedals to move on and concentrate on new Dinosaural designs and products for the future. These included the OPA-101 Overdriven Preamp, OTC-201 Opticompressor, a brief run of hand-wired dual-mode treble boosters plus a small run of reissues in black of the original silver Tube Bender (all of which are now discontinued, though the Thorpy FX "Fat General" compressor is heavily based on the OTC-201).

Dan Coggins resumed the servicing and repair of the old Lovetone pedals in 2013 and continues to do so. Though Dinosaural still exists as a brand and registered trademark, Dan is now operating as Coggins Audio Ltd. and has been doing design collaborations with Adrian and Georgia Thorpe of Thorpy FX Ltd. since 2015. These co-designs include the ‘Deep Oggin’ chorus-vibrato, the "Camoflange' analogue flanger, ‘Fat General’ Compressor, the ‘Chain Home’ repeat-percussion tremolo, ‘Team Medic’ versatile EQ and the ‘Fallout Cloud’ Fuzz, to name a few. In early 2020, the Thorpy FX "Field Marshal" fuzz and "Bunker" intermodulation distortion drive pedals were introduced: these are re-imagined, updated, smaller and more affordable versions of the rare and long-discontinued Lovetone "Big Cheese" and "Brown Source" (respectively) circuits that Dan Coggins originally designed for Lovetone in 1995.

Big Cheese

The Big Cheese is a fuzzbox. Its controls are:

 "Curds" (Gain)
 "Whey" (Volume)
 "Hog/Bee" (Tone)

It also has a tone selector switch, with four different settings:

 Off (tone bypass)
 1 (mid-scoop)
 2 (mid-boost)
 "Swiss" (gated)

Notable musicians who have used the Big Cheese include:
 The Edge of U2 (can be heard on "Discothèque")
 Nick Wheeler of The All-American Rejects
 Colin Greenwood of Radiohead (can be heard on "The National Anthem" and "Packt Like Sardines in a Crushd Tin Box", only when played live). The four earliest Lovetone pedals can be heard in places throughout "OK Computer" and the Ring Stinger appears on the title track from "Kid A"
 J Mascis of Dinosaur Jr.
 Mark Deutrom of The Melvins and Bellringer
 Jeff Tweedy of Wilco (can be heard on the live version "At Least That's What You Said". Contrary to popular opinion, the studio version was recorded using a small 1x12 Supro amp)
 Jimmy Page and John Paul Jones of Led Zeppelin
 Brian Molko of Placebo
 Bob Rock
 Dale Davis of Amy Winehouse's band
 Gary Moore of Thin Lizzy
 Stephen Malkmus of Pavement Terror Twilight album - "Cream of Gold"
 Bootsy Collins
 Tim Bran of Dreadzone
 Billy Duffy of The Cult
 Nick Fyffe of The Temperance Movement and formerly Jamiroquai
 Larry Graham
 Steve Hackett of Genesis
 Ernie Isley
 Kevin Shields of My Bloody Valentine
 Danny Kortchmar
 Johnny Marr of The Smiths
 Nick McCabe of The Verve
 Will Sergeant of Echo and the Bunnymen
 Nikki Sixx of Mötley Crüe and Sixx:A.M.
 Matthew Sweet
 Doug Wimbish
 Justin Chancellor of Tool
 Jon Foreman of Switchfoot

Meatball
The Lovetone web site describes the Meatball as "an amazing envelope follower/triggered filter".  The effects produced are similar to those of wah and flanger/phaser pedals.  The Meatball has two sections—the trigger section and the filter section. The trigger section has the following controls:

 "Sensitivity" - Determines the level at which triggering operates.
 "Attack" - Filter attack response
 "Decay" - Filter decay time
 "Up/Down" - A two-position switch that determines whether the filter sweeps up or down.
 "Full/half/off" - A three-position switch that determines the level of the bandwidth. Half the bandwidth affects only higher frequencies, while the off position turns off the trigger section, allowing the Meatball to be used as a static-tone filter.

The filter section has the following controls:

 "Colour" - Filter resonance
 "Intensity" - Filter depth
 "Blend" - Ratio of dry to wet signal
 "Frequency range" - A four-position switch that determines the range of the frequency, from low to high.
 "Filter selection" - A three-position switch that determines the level of the bandwidth, between low-pass, band-pass, and high-pass filter.

It has an effects loop, where external effects could be placed after the trigger section but before the filter section. It also has two jacks for passive volume pedals to control the decay and the intensity. It was reissued by Dinosaural from 2003 to 2007.

The Meatball was used by Metallica's Kirk Hammett for the Wah-like sound in the opening riff of "I Disappear".

Other effects

 Brown Source - overdrive
 Doppelganger - dual LFO phaser/vibrato
 Wobulator - dual LFO optical tremolo and stereo panner
 Ring Stinger - ring modulator, 'germanium diode and transformer matrix' octave fuzz, DALEK emulator, simple analog synthesizer
 ? (Flange with No Name) - stereo analogue flanger, multi-function time/stereo modulation effect, simple analog synthesizer
 Cheese Source - combination of the Big Cheese and Brown Source in one unit

References

External links
Lovetone
Dinosaural
Harmony Central's page on the Big Cheese
Effects Database Lovetone interview
Effects Database Dinosaural interview
Thorpy FX

Guitar effects manufacturing companies
Music equipment manufacturers